Hollywood Gaming at Dayton Raceway is a racino in Dayton, Ohio, United States. It was originally established in 1959 as Raceway Park in Toledo, Ohio, hosting car racing and thoroughbred racing. It is owned by Gaming and Leisure Properties and operated by Penn Entertainment.

Racing 

Known for weekend live harness racing including Ohio Sire Stakes and Buckeye-Wolverine Pace. The Buckeye-Wolverine Pace took place every year until ending recently. The race once successfully predicted the outcome of the rival Ohio State-Michigan football game with 75% accuracy.

Move to Dayton
In 2011, Governor John Kasich agreed to allow video lottery terminals at Ohio's seven racetracks. To avoid having Raceway Park compete with its own Hollywood Casino Toledo, Penn National sought and obtained state approval to move Raceway Park to Dayton. The racetrack move was completed in the spring of 2014. The racino opened on August 28, 2014 with 1,000 video lottery terminals.

References

External links
 

Buildings and structures in Dayton, Ohio
Casinos in Ohio
Sports venues in Dayton, Ohio
Tourist attractions in Dayton, Ohio
Horse racing venues in Ohio
Harness racing venues in the United States